A list of films produced in Spain in 1960 (see 1960 in film).

1960

External links
 Spanish films of 1960 at the Internet Movie Database

1960
Spanish
Films